The title Lord Mayor of Coventry was created on 3 June 1953 when the dignity was conferred on the city of Coventry, England by Letters Patent as part of the Coronation celebrations of Queen Elizabeth II.
Prior to that Coventry had had a Mayor since it was granted its Charter of Incorporation by King Edward III in 1345.

The Lord Mayor is the Chairman of the City Council and has the casting vote. As Coventry's first citizen, they are the non-political, ceremonial head of the city.

Notable Mayors of Coventry

1546-7: John Harford
 1583 Henry Breres (MP for Coventry, 1586 and 1601)
 1587 Henry Sewall (MP for Coventry, 1621)
 1606 Henry Sewall
 1609 Sampson Hopkins (MP for Coventry, 1614 and 1621)
 1631 William Jesson (MP for Coventry, 1640)
 1633 Simon Norton (MP for Coventry, 1640)
 1634 John Barker (MP for Coventry, 1640)
 1655 Robert Beake (MP for Coventry, 1654–1660)
 1834 George Eld (antiquary and editor of the Coventry Standard)
 1835 H. Cadwallader Adams
 1858 W. Wilmot
 1861–1862 Thomas Soden
 1889–1891 Alderman Charles John Hill
 1891–1894 George Singer (founder of Singer Cycle Company)
 1894–1903 Alderman Tomson (Liberal)
 1911–1912 William Fitzthomas Wyley  (Colonel and Founder of Coventry and Warwickshire Society of Artists) 
 1913–1914 Siegfried Bettmann (founder of Triumph Cycle company)
 1937 Alice Arnold – trade unionist; first female mayor
 1941 Alfred Robert Grindlay (industrialist, founder of Grindlay Peerless Cycle Company and Mayor during the Coventry Blitz)

Lord Mayors of Coventry

Coventry's Lord Mayors have included:

References

 

Coventry, Lord Mayors of the City of
Lord Mayors